Princess Euncheon of the Im clan or Princess Sagi was a Korean royal consort and the 4th wife of King Chunghye of Goryeo. She was also known as Princess Oji.

Biography

Early life and background
The future Princess Euncheon was born as the daughter of merchant Im-Sin (임신) who served Grand Prince Danyang, a grandson of Chungnyeol of Goryeo. While she and her father made their living by selling porcelain vessels, she then was found and favored not long after that by King Chunghye, also become his concubine and most favourite wife.

Palace life
In 1340, Im then entered the palace by Chunghye's order and become Palace Lady Im (궁인 임씨, 宮人 林氏) and two years later, in February, Lady Hong was chosen as became Chunghye's 3rd wife and given a royal title. Seeing about this, Im was jealous and tried to stop it, but for comforted her, the King then trusted the royal title Princess Euncheon (은천옹주, 銀川翁主) to her. However, peoples recently called Im as Princess Sagi (사기옹주, 沙器翁主) which came from she whom selling a porcelain vessels (사기, 沙器) and Princess Oji (오지옹주).

It was said that King Chunghye usually took an energized drug called Yeoryak (열약) and after contracted the effects while he still a Crown Prince in the Yuan Dynasty, he then transmitted this to the women with whom they had a night together. At this time, no one can handle the King's energy or suffered from it effects, but just Im whom able to handle him and those make her become more loves from him. Also, when she gave birth into their son, the King robbed the linen and silk market and gave it to her as her gift. She was said to be very lustful and got along well with the King, also know if she had a luxurious personality, so she told the King to build a new palace for her to live in.

In 1343, the King gave foods to the crowds mobilized for her new palace's construction  and gave them awards while performed the dances. In the progress, by Im's order, many millstones and treadmills were installed. However, in November in the same year, the Yuan Dynasty captured King Chunghye and followed him, her luxurious life was ended. Go Yongbo (고용보) and others led Chunghye away, but it not for the Princess whom sad that her husband only wore a simple-robe and then begged Yongbo to donated and gave the new rope for Chunghye. After he was taken away, she and about 120 other royal officials whom on the King's side were immediately expelled from the palace.

Later life
There were no records left after her expelled and left day from the palace. Actually, she bore Chunghye 1 son, Wang Seokgi, however, he didn't received and treated like the other princes, instead became a Buddhist monk. After got exiled to Jeju, Seok-gi then married a civilian woman and had a son, but his family wasn't recorded too detailed in Goryeosa. Later, in May 1375, Seok-gi was executed and in April 1382, his son was also murdered.

References

External links
 
Princess Euncheon on Encykorea .
Princess Euncheon on EToday News .
Princess Euncheon on Goryeosa .

14th-century births
14th-century deaths
Royal consorts of the Goryeo Dynasty
14th-century Korean women